John (Jack) Cristopher Coleman (1914–1971) was a respected Irish geographer, archaeologist, speleologist and mountaineer. He devoted much of his life to the study of the caves of Ireland, the product of which were his many contributions to scientific journals in Ireland and the United Kingdom, his founding of the Speleological Society of Ireland and the publishing of his book, The Caves of Ireland.

His dedication to the exploration of Irish caves and highly respected articles published both nationally and abroad were pivotal in boosting the study of speleology in Ireland during the mid to late 20th century, earning him the affectionate title of the "father of Irish caving".

Life and caving exploits
Coleman was born in Cork, Ireland and worked for Bord Fáilte from 1945, having trained as a geographer in Cork University.

He began caving in 1932, initially exploring caves within cycling distance of his home in Cork City such as Carrigtwohill Caves and Ovens Caves (where he found weapons left over from the Civil War).

In 1940 Coleman met Portlaoise textile chemist N. J. Dunnington, who joined him in explorations of caves in South Cork. In July 1941 the pair cycled heavily laden bicycles to County Clare to investigate Pollnagollum, and over the ensuing years undertook a systematic exploration of the cave system. In 1944 the Royal Irish Academy published an article on the cave system by Coleman and Dunnington, which received widespread praise from the scientific community and attracted a new wave of speleologists to the Burren.

Coleman was the first speleologist to identify scalloping as an indicator of the direction of water flow in a cave. His findings, made between 1946 and 1949, were published by the University of Bristol Spelæological Society (UBSS). Coleman would later cite the relationship that he built with the society over the following years to be a major stimulus in continuing his work on Irish caves, and ultimately in completing his book on the subject. By the 1960s he had been made Honorary Life Member of the UBSS.

Throughout the 1950s Coleman carried out much scientific fieldwork in areas such as Counties Sligo, Monaghan and Kerry, and the Cong region, which would pave the way for further discoveries by local and visiting speleologists.

In 1964 Coleman founded the Speleological Society of Ireland, the first representative body for cavers in Ireland. He was also the first editor of the Society's journal Irish Speleology. Coleman published his work widely in a number of publications. His articles included work on Dunmore Cave, Carrigtwohill Caves and Pollnagollum, but it was not until 1965 that his seminal work, The Caves of Ireland, was published. Originally written by Coleman as his MA thesis at Cork University, the book was the first and currently only publication to comprehensively list and describe cave sites throughout Ireland.

Coleman was also a prominent member of the Irish Mountaineering Club and was president of the club from 1950 to 1953.

Coleman was killed in a car accident on 20 April 1971, at the age of 57. He was survived by his wife, son and three daughters.

List of publications

Books

Articles

See also 
 Caving
 :Category:Caves of Ireland

References

Further reading 
 

Cavers
Speleologists
Irish geographers
20th-century Irish geologists
Irish mountain climbers
1914 births
1971 deaths
20th-century geographers